The 2014 KPL Top 8 Cup was the fourth edition of the tournament, which kicked off on 5 April and ended on 15 June. to be contested by the top 8 teams of the 2013 season of the Kenyan Premier League: A.F.C. Leopards, Bandari, Gor Mahia, Kenya Commercial Bank, Sofapaka, Thika United, Tusker and Ulinzi Stars.

Having won their first title the previous season, defending champions Tusker retained their title after beating A.F.C. Leopards 2–1 in the final played at the Kinoru Stadium in Meru.

Competition format
The tournament follows a single-elimination format for the quarter-finals and the final, where the winning team immediately advances to the next round or wins the tournament, respectively.

For the semi-finals, the tournament adopts a double-elimination format, where a team must win two legs to advance to the final. If both teams are equal on aggregate goals at the end of the two legs, a penalty shoot-out will be conducted to determine who advances to the final. The away goals rule also applies in this round.

2013 Kenyan Premier League standings

Bracket

Quarter-finals
The draw for the quarter-finals was held on 26 March, and the ties scheduled for 5−6 and 19−20 April.

Fixtures

Semi-finals
The draw for the semi-finals was held on 22 April.

First leg
The first leg ties of the semi-finals were played on 7 and 25 May.

Fixtures

Second leg
The second leg ties of the semi-finals were played on 4 and 11 June.

Fixtures

Tusker win 2–1 on aggregate.

A.F.C. Leopards win 4–1 on aggregate.

Final
The final was played on 15 June.

Top scorers

Team statistics

|-
|colspan="20"|Eliminated in the semi-finals
|-

|-
|colspan="20"|Eliminated in the quarter-finals
|-

Notes

References

KPL Top 8 Cup seasons
Top 8 Cup